= Kachhi Barkheda =

Village in Madhya Pradesh, India

- village
- Location within Madhya Pradesh Location within India
- Coordinates: 23.4181089°N 77.38699°E
- Country: India
- State: Madhya Pradesh
- District: Bhopal
- Tehsil: Huzur
- Elevation: 479 m (1,572 ft)

Population (2011)
  - Total: 808
- Time zone: UTC+5:30 (IST)
- ISO 3166 code: MP-IN
- 2011 census code: 482392

Kachhi Barkheda is a village in the Bhopal district of Madhya Pradesh, India. It is located in the Huzur tehsil and the Phanda block.

== Demographics ==
According to the 2011 census of India, Kachhi Barkheda has 155 households. The effective literacy rate (i.e. the literacy rate of population excluding children aged 6 and below) is 73.31%.

Demographics (2011 Census)
	Total	Male	Female
Population	808	426	382
Children aged below 6 years	96	56	40
Scheduled caste	226	118	108
Scheduled tribe	0	0	0
Literates	522	304	218
Workers (all)	325	215	110
Main workers (total)	207	162	45
Main workers: Cultivators	116	94	22
Main workers: Agricultural labourers	45	35	10
Main workers: Household industry workers	14	9	5
Main workers: Other	32	24	8
Marginal workers (total)	118	53	65
Marginal workers: Cultivators	2	1	1
Marginal workers: Agricultural labourers	99	43	56
Marginal workers: Household industry workers	3	0	3
Marginal workers: Others	14	9	5
Non-workers	483	211	272
